Oliver Dlouhý (born 7 January 1988) is a Czech entrepreneur, founder and CEO of the online travel agency Kiwi.com. The Forbes business magazine included Oliver to Forbes Czech "30 under 30". On 30 May 2016 NBC News invited Oliver to explain how the unique searching algorithm works. In August 2017 the company provided access to over 700 airlines and served over 50 million searches daily. For the 7165% growth the company was ranked 7th in Deloitte Technology Fast 500 Awards, category Fast 500 EMEA in 2017.

In May 2017 Oliver said he expects to double the company's sales to 700 million euros and in 2018 to grow faster due to expansion of database connections and adding the ground transport.

On 3 March 2020 the Czech prime minister Andrej Babiš gave him the award 'Podnikatel roku' (Entrepreneur of the Year) 2019, in which the turnover of Kiwi.com exceeded 30 billion Czech crowns.

After initial successes of Kiwi.com currently there are instances of unhappy customers that have been reported which started during the pandemic. With an average review score of 1.8/5 on Trustpilot, the website has declassified Kiwi.com to a public rating "Poor".

See also
Kiwi.com
Deloitte Fast 500

References

External links 
https://www.linkedin.com/in/oliverdlouhy
https://twitter.com/oliverdlouhy
https://www.kiwi.com/en/

1988 births
Czech businesspeople
Czech company founders
Living people